M-213 was a state highway route designation in the U.S. state of Michigan that was used twice:
M-213 (1959 Michigan highway), now part of B-35
M-213 (1960 Michigan highway), now part of M-20